Clayton was the name of a town in section 4 of Seely Township, Faribault County, Minnesota, United States.

History
Clayton had a post office from 1860 until 1899.  The town failed to develop as hoped, and the population dwindled and the buildings were moved to neighboring Bricelyn, until in 1977 only the cemetery remained.

Notes

Former populated places in Minnesota
Former populated places in Faribault County, Minnesota